Sarah Bush Lincoln (December 13, 1788 – April 12, 1869) was the second wife of Thomas Lincoln and stepmother of Abraham Lincoln. She was born in Kentucky to Christopher and Hannah Bush. She married her first husband, Daniel Johnston, in 1806, and they had three children. Daniel Johnston died in 1816, and in 1819, she married widower Thomas Lincoln, joining his family with her three children.

Early life
Sarah Bush was born December 13, 1788, in Hardin County, Kentucky, the third daughter to Hannah Davis (1745–1835) and Christopher Bush (1735–1813). Christopher Bush, a settler of Dutch ancestry, was a  financially well-off slave patrol captain. Described as "a stirring, industrious man," he owned more than two thousand acres of Kentucky land. The Bushes moved with their nine children to Elizabethtown, Kentucky, when Sarah was two years old. As a child, Sarah prided herself on her appearance and keeping up with the latest fashion. She had blue-gray eyes and was light complexioned. Sarah has been described as proud, energetic, hard working, neat, and possessing good sense.

Her brother Isaac (1779–1827) sold Thomas Lincoln the Sinking Stream Farm.

Marriage and family

Daniel Johnston
Sarah Bush married Daniel Johnston (1782–1816) on March 13, 1806. The Johnstons were parents to three children: John, Elizabeth and Matilda.

The Johnstons struggled financially throughout their marriage, having little or no taxable property and debts that Daniel's brothers sometimes settled. In 1814, Daniel obtained the position of county jailer, which included living quarters for the family within the jailhouse. Sarah became the cook and cleaner for the jail. In addition, the couple performed cleaning services for the courthouse. In 1816, Daniel died of cholera during an epidemic. Thereafter, Sarah seems to have recovered financially somewhat; she purchased a cabin that had previously been owned by Samuel Haycraft, furnished it with luxurious furnishings, and sent one of her daughters to a private school.

Thomas Lincoln

Indiana

Thomas Lincoln (1778–1851) met Sarah in Elizabethtown, Kentucky. After Nancy died in 1818, Thomas returned to Elizabethtown as he had heard that Sarah Bush Johnston was then a widow. His proposal was apparently: "I have no wife and you no husband. I came a-purpose to marry you. I knowed you from a gal and you knowed me from a boy. I've no time to lose: and if you're willin' let it be done straight off." The two decided to marry, and Lincoln paid her outstanding debts. Sarah and Thomas married on December 2, 1819 in a log house on Main Street in Elizabethtown. He brought her and her three children, who ranged from 8 to 13 years of age, to his farm in Indiana, where she became stepmother to his two children. Sarah transformed the home with the addition of furniture and furnishings that would have seemed luxurious to the Lincolns, cleaned up the house and children, and insisted upon the placement of a wooden floor in the cabin, loft for the boys (John Johnston, Abraham Lincoln and Dennis Hanks), creation of a greased paper window and completion of the roof.

Dennis Hanks described Sarah:

She treated Sarah and Abraham the same as her own children, earning the lasting affection of Abraham, who was 10 when she arrived; he always addressed her as "Mama." She encouraged his appetite for reading and learning, giving him access to books she had brought from Kentucky, including the Bible, Aesop's Fables, The Pilgrim's Progress and Lessons in Elocution.

Sarah's daughter Elizabeth married Dennis Hanks in 1821, and the couple lived in their own home about a half a mile from Sarah and Thomas' home. In 1823 Sarah, Thomas and his daughter, joined the nearby Little Pigeon Creek Baptist Church. Although Abraham did not join the church, he attended church and listened to sermons; he sometimes got in trouble for parodying the minister's sermons. In 1826, Abraham's sister Sarah married Aaron Grigsby and lived near the Lincoln home; she died within a year and a half during childbirth. Her grave is located at the Lincoln State Park. Matilda married shortly after Sarah was married and moved away with her husband Squire Hall.

Illinois

Thomas sold his Indiana land early in 1830 and with Sarah moved first to Macon County, Illinois, and eventually to Coles County in 1831.

Abraham sometimes visited Sarah and Thomas when he was in Coles County on the law circuit; Sarah recalled that she "saw him every year or two." After Thomas died in 1851, Lincoln maintained land for Sarah and supported her until his death. Their final visit was before Lincoln left Illinois for the White House. Illinois historian Charles H. Coleman recounted two narratives of how she received the news of her stepson's murder:

Sarah died in 1869. Sarah is buried next to Thomas in nearby Shiloh Cemetery, just south of Lerna, Illinois.

Abraham and Sarah's relationship
The Sarah Bush Johnston Lincoln biography by the National Park Service summarizes the relationship between Abraham Lincoln and his stepmother:

Lincoln's legendary sense of humor was probably influenced by his stepmother. He recalled that she was a firm but kind-hearted woman who loved to laugh. When he was 18 years old, Lincoln, at 6' 4", was so tall that his head nearly touched the ceiling of the family's farmhouse kitchen. His stepmother repeatedly joked that Lincoln was so tall that he needed to keep his hair washed or he'd leave prints on her ceiling. Lincoln decided to have some fun with this idea. One day, when his stepmother was not home, Lincoln got together a group of younger boys and had them dip their bare feet in the mud outside the farmhouse kitchen. Then Lincoln took each of the boys inside, held them upside-down, and had them walk their feet across the ceiling, leaving muddy footprints. When Sarah Lincoln saw the muddy footprints on her ceiling, Lincoln recalled, she chuckled as she threatened to spank him.

Honors
 Sarah Bush Johnston Lincoln Memorial in Elizabethtown, Kentucky
 The homestead where she and Thomas lived in Illinois is preserved as the Lincoln Log Cabin State Historic Site. 
 The Sarah Bush Lincoln Health Center in Coles County, Illinois was named after her.

Notes

References

Further reading
 Charles H. Coleman (1952) Sarah Bush Lincoln, The Mother Who Survived Him. East Illinois State College.
 Lincoln Financial Foundation Collection (1959) Thomas Lincoln Family - Johnston-Lincoln Marriage. Lincoln Financial Foundation Collection.
 Lincoln Financial Foundation Collection (1895) Thomas Lincoln Family. Lincoln Financial Foundation Collection.
 Louis Austin Warren (1922) Sarah Bush Lincoln: The Beloved Foster Mother of Abraham Lincoln: A Memorial. Elizabethtown Woman's Club.
 Louis Austin Warren (1940) Three Lincoln Mothers. Lincoln National Life Insurance Company. Lincoln Financial Foundation Collection.

External links
 "Sarah Bush Johnston Lincoln", Lincoln Home National Historic Site webpage, National Park Service

1788 births
1869 deaths
18th-century American people
18th-century American women
19th-century American people
19th-century American women
Lincoln family
People from Coles County, Illinois
People from Elizabethtown, Kentucky
Burials in Illinois
Kentucky women homemakers